The Iglesia de la Virgen del Rivero is a church located in San Esteban de Gormaz, Spain. It was declared Bien de Interés Cultural in 1996.

References 

Bien de Interés Cultural landmarks in the Province of Soria
Churches in Castile and León